Raymond Claiborne Osborne (September 7, 1933 – March 3, 2011), was a Florida Republican Party politician who served as the first Lieutenant Governor of Florida under the state constitution of 1968. Osborne was the state's first lieutenant governor since 1889. Appointed by Republican Governor Claude R. Kirk, Jr., Osborne was sworn in on January 7, 1969, for a term that lasted two years.

Born in Winston-Salem, North Carolina, Osborne graduated from North Carolina State University in 1955. He then served in the United States Army from 1955 to 1957. Osborne graduated from the University of North Carolina School of Law in 1961. Osborne moved with his wife to St. Petersburg, Florida. From 1964 to 1968, Osborne served in the Florida House of Representatives, and unsuccessfully ran for the Florida Public Service Commission in 1968. Osborne practiced law for many years in Boca Raton, Florida, until his death in March 2011.

References 

Republican Party members of the Florida House of Representatives
Lieutenant Governors of Florida
1933 births
2011 deaths
People from Boca Raton, Florida
People from St. Petersburg, Florida
Politicians from Winston-Salem, North Carolina
North Carolina State University alumni
University of North Carolina School of Law alumni
Florida lawyers
North Carolina lawyers
20th-century American lawyers